The Canon Ranch Railroad Eclipse Windmill is a historic windpump that was located near Sheffield, Texas.

The windmill was built in 1898 and added to the National Register of Historic Places in 1977. It was one of only four known to exist and was the last one still situated above its original well.  It was restored in 2001 by the nationally renowned windmill expert, Jim Collums of Poteet, TX, and his nephew, Woldhagen James. In 2019, the windmill was moved to the National Ranching Heritage Center in Lubbock, Texas for additional restoration and permanent installation in the Center's 27-acre historical park.

It is one of few surviving Railroad Eclipse Windmills, which were the largest commercially produced windmills in the U.S. and were used along railway routes in the Southwest.  This served as the primary source of water at the headquarters of the Canon Ranch. At  in diameter, it is the largest size of windmill produce by the Eclipse Company.

See also

National Register of Historic Places listings in Pecos County, Texas
Eclipse windmill
Moriarty Eclipse Windmill

References

External links

Windpumps in the United States
Buildings and structures on the National Register of Historic Places in Texas
Buildings and structures in Pecos County, Texas
Windmills completed in 1898
Water supply infrastructure on the National Register of Historic Places
Windmills in Texas
Historic American Engineering Record in Texas
National Register of Historic Places in Pecos County, Texas
1898 establishments in Texas
Fairbanks-Morse
Windmills on the National Register of Historic Places